Sebastian Synoradzki (born 27 November 1970 in Częstochowa) is Polish footballer who played as defender and football coach.

His father Witold was a footballer as well, he represented Raków in the Polish Cup final in 1967.

Football career
He played mainly in Raków Częstochowa. He played there since 1985 to 1992 and since 1994 to 2000. Between 1992 and 1994 he played in Wawel Kraków. In spring round of 2000/2001 season he was a player of Świt Nowy Dwór Mazowiecki. Season 2001/2002 he spent in Astra Krotoszyn and in season 2002/2003 he played in Heko Czermno. Between 2003 and 2008 he was a player of Victoria Częstochowa and after that ended career. He never played in Poland national football team.

Coaching career
Between 2009 and 2010 he was a coach of LKS Kamienica Polska. He has been promoted to fifth league with this club. In December 2010 he signed with Znicz Kłobuck. In October 2011 he has been appointed as coach of Unia Rędziny. In May 2013 he became a coach of Orły Kusięta. He resigned on 14 March 2016.

References

Bibliography
 
  

Polish footballers
1970 births
Living people
Sportspeople from Częstochowa
Association football defenders